The Wood River Refinery is an oil refinery located in Roxana, Illinois, approximately  north of St. Louis, Missouri, on the east side of the Mississippi River. The refinery is currently owned by Phillips 66 and Cenovus Energy and operated by the joint-venture company WRB Refining, LLC (WRB).  WRB was formed on 1 July 2007, with Encana taking a 49% interest in Wood River and also Phillips 66's Borger refinery. Encana subsequently spun off oil sands producer Cenovus and ConocoPhillips spun off Phillips 66.  In return for a 49% stake in the refinery, ConocoPhillips gained a joint interest in two Alberta oil sands (bitumen) heavy oil projects: Christina Lake (Alberta) and Foster Creek. ConocoPhillips’ interest was sold to Cenovus in May 2017, leaving Cenovus the sole owner and operator of the assets. Cenovus uses SAGD (steam-assisted gravity drainage) technology at those sites.

The complex is capable of refining  of crude oil per day and is the largest refinery operated by Phillips 66. Oil is supplied from the Gulf of Mexico, Canada, and domestic sources through pipelines.

A new four-drum coker unit, part of Wood River Refinery's Coker and Refinery Expansion (CORE) was completed in November 2011. The new coker has a capacity of 75,000 barrels per day and is expected to expand the capacity to handle the bitumen from the Alberta oil sands by nearly 700%. The new Wood River coker's processing capacity is approximately 200,000 - 220,000 barrels per day. The CORE project took about three years to build, with a total cost of US $3.8 billion (US $1.9 billion to Cenovus), and has increased clean product yield by 5% to approximately 85%. The expansion was undertaken specifically to handle heavy oil imported from Alberta. The refined transportation fuels products are destined for the U.S. Midwest market, including St. Louis and Chicago.

An RO filtration system upgrade to treat boiler water was also completed in 2011. 3500 total feet of pipe on 800 feet of modular pipe rack was installed along movable trailers containing the filtration system. This expansion increased the amount of steam available to the refinery.  Thermal cracking, stripping and power generation are some of the major processes within a refinery that use steam.

Wood River Refinery was originally built by Shell in 1917.  In the late 1990s, Shell and Texaco merged their downstream segments to form the Motiva (with Saudi national oil company Saudi Aramco) and Equilon joint ventures.  During a prolonged period of low refining profit margins, Equilon sold the refinery to Tosco in 2003.  Shortly thereafter, Phillips Petroleum acquired Tosco.  When Conoco and Phillips merged, the refinery became an asset of ConocoPhillips.

References

External links
 Wood River Refinery History Museum
 Phillips 66 refineries Central Corridor
 Cenovus's refineries
 Cenovus's technology: SAGD

Phillips 66
Buildings and structures in Madison County, Illinois
Companies based in Madison County, Illinois
Energy infrastructure completed in 1917
Energy infrastructure in Illinois
Oil refineries in the United States